North Williamstown railway station is located on the Williamstown line in Victoria, Australia. It serves the south-western Melbourne suburbs of Newport and Williamstown, and it opened on 1 February 1859.

The Newport Railway Museum is located on nearby Champion Road, approximately 200 metres from the station.

History

North Williamstown station opened on opened on 1 February 1859, just under a month after the railway line from Newport was extended to Williamstown Pier.

In 1967, manually operated boom barriers replaced interlocked gates at the former Ferguson Street level crossing, which was located at the Down end of the station. In 1969, the boom barriers were converted to automatic operation, and the signal box for the level crossing was abolished.

The land that is located east of the station was once occupied by a strip of historic commercial premises, but is now used as car parking. Various proposals have been made by railway land manager VicTrack to subdivide this land for a high-density residential development.

The level crossing was a part of the first 50 crossings to be grade separated under the original scope of the Level Crossing Removal Project, which was promised by then opposition leader Daniel Andrews at the 2014 State Election. In November 2019, the LXRP announced that consultation with the community for the project had started. On 19 June 2020, it was announced that the level crossing will be removed by lowering the railway line under the road, and will include rebuilding the station. On 11 October of that year, designs were released and, in January 2021, contracts were awarded. Major construction began in May 2021, with the station temporary closing on 2 August of that year. On 17 December 2021, the rebuilt station opened to passengers. As part of the project, the station building on Platform 2 was demolished, however the building on Platform 1 was retained for station operations.

Platforms and services

North Williamstown has two side platforms. It is serviced by Metro Trains' Williamstown line services.

Platform 1:
  all stations services to Flinders Street and Frankston

Platform 2:
  all stations services to Williamstown

Transport links

CDC Melbourne operates one route via North Williamstown station, under contract to Public Transport Victoria:
 : Laverton station – Williamstown

Transit Systems Victoria operates one route via North Williamstown station, under contract to Public Transport Victoria:
 : Williamstown – Moonee Ponds Junction

Gallery

References

External links
 
 Melway map at street-directory.com.au

Railway stations in Melbourne
Railway stations in Australia opened in 1859
Williamstown, Victoria
Railway stations in the City of Hobsons Bay